Robert Lachowicz (born 8 February 1990) is an English professional ice hockey left winger who is currently playing for Elite Ice Hockey League side Guildford Flames.

Lachowicz has spent over ten years playing with the Nottingham Panthers, winning nine trophies. He also had a brief stint with Manchester Phoenix in 2009, playing in the English Premier Ice Hockey League, before returning to play in Nottingham.  He is also a member of the Great Britain national ice hockey team.

In October 2020, following the suspension of the 2020–21 Elite League season due to ongoing coronavirus restrictions, Lachowicz moved to Germany to sign for Füchse Duisburg. 

In February 2021, Lachowicz signed for Telford Tigers ahead of their NIHL Spring Cup series.

After playing for the Nottingham Panthers in the 2021 Elite Series, Lachowicz ended his 14-year association with the club by signing for fellow EIHL side Guildford Flames ahead of the 2021–22 season.

References

External links

1990 births
Living people
English ice hockey left wingers
Guildford Flames players
Manchester Phoenix players
Nottingham Panthers players
Telford Tigers players
Sportspeople from Nottingham